The 2006–07 Copa Federación de España is the 14th staging of the Copa Federación de España, a knockout competition for Spanish football clubs in Segunda División B and Tercera División.

The competition began in August 2006 with the Regional stages and ended with the finals on 11 and 18 April 2007.

Autonomous Communities tournaments

Asturias tournament

Qualifying tournament

Group A

Group B

Group C

Group D

Semifinals

|}

Final

|}

Castile and León tournament

Group A

Group B

Final

|}

Navarre tournament

Semifinals

|}

Final

|}

National tournament

National Qualifying round

|}

Round of 32

|}

Round of 16

|}

Quarter-finals

|}

Semifinals

|}

Final

|}

References
Old website of Marino de Luanco

Copa Federación de España seasons
Fed
Copa
Copa